Battle of Durazzo may refer to:

Battle of Dyrrhachium (1081), also known as Siege of Durazzo
Battle of Durazzo (1915)
Battle of Durazzo (1918)
Battle of Durrës (1939)